The 92nd Infantry Regiment is a unit of the French Army. Tracing its descent from a unit of Irish troops in French service established in 1661, it received its regimental number in 1790.  Since 1881 the unit has been garrisoned at Clermont-Ferrand in Auvergne-Rhône-Alpes.  The regiment fought at the battles of Verdun and the Somme in the First World War and in the Battle of France in 1940. The unit was revived in 1944 as a unit of the Maquis. In recent years it has served on Opération Chammal in Iraq and on Operation Barkhane in Chad and Mali.

The 92nd Regiment currently serves in the mechanised infantry role and is equipped with the Véhicule blindé de combat d'infanterie.

History 

The 92nd Infantry Regiment traces its descent from a unit of Irish troops in French service in 1661. The regiment received its numerical designation in 1790 and has been garrisoned at Clermont-Ferrand in Auvergne-Rhône-Alpes since 1881. The 92nd Regiment fought at the battles of Verdun and the Somme in the First World War.  In 1933 future French president Georges Pompidou served in the regiment as a second lieutenant.

The 92nd Regiment suffered heavy losses in the 1940 Battle of France and their flag was lost in the sinking of the French destroyer Siroco off Dunkirk on 31 May.  The unit was re-established in 1944 from a group of Maquis operating in Auvergne.

The 92nd Regiment deployed during the War in Afghanistan and built the bell tower at the Tora Bora base. The unit successfully petitioned for permission to relocate the tower back to France before handing the base over to the Afghan National Army.

The 92nd Regiment was the first equipped with the Véhicule blindé de combat d'infanterie to be deployed to Mali in 2013. It has deployed as part of Opération Sentinelle, the post-2015 security assistance provided by the army in France.  In 2017 the 92nd Regiment deployed on Opération Chammal in Iraq, from 2018 to 2019 was on Operation Barkhane in Chad and in 2020 deployed on the same operation to Mali. In September 2021 a detachment of 600 men of the regiment were deployed to Mali and to Lebanon.

Structure 

The 92nd Regiment is currently part of the French Army's 2nd Armoured Brigade.  It amounts to 1,500 personnel in five combat companies, a support company, a command and logistics company and two reserve companies.

Its equipment includes:
968 x Heckler & Koch HK416 assault rifles
110 x FN Minimi light machine guns
54 x MAG58 general purpose machine guns
10 x LLR 81mm mortars
14 x MILAN anti-tank missile launchers
58 x Petit Véhicule Protégé 4x4 light armoured vehicles
30 x Poste Eryx anti-tank equipped armoured personnel carriers
96 x Véhicule blindé de combat d'infanterie
10 x Masstech unarmoured vehicles
56 x Renault GBC 180 trucks

Honours 
The 92nd Regiment has received the following battle honours:

Rivoli 1797
Austerlitz 1805
Jena 1806
Constantine 1837
Ypres 1914
Verdun 1916-1917
The Somme 1916
The Ourcq 1918

The regimental flag also bears the wording "Honneur et Patrie" and the Croix de Guerre 1914-1918 with three palms.  The regimental insignia shows a Gaul's head on a silver shield with red enamel edging from which the members of the regiment are known as Gauls. The garrison is near to Gergovie which is associated with the victory of Gallic chief Vercingetorix over the Romans at the Battle of Gergovia. The regimental motto is "Debout soldats d'Auvergne, debout ça va barder! À moi...! Auvergne... !" (French for "Stand-up, soldiers of Auvergne, stand-up, it will be tough! To me! Auvergne!") which comes from words spoken by Nicolas-Louis d'Assas, of the Auvergne Regiment, at the Battle of Kloster Kampen in 1760.

References 

Infantry regiments of France
Military units and formations established in 1661
1661 establishments in Europe
1660s establishments in France